Bradfield is a neighbourhood in the city of Bulawayo, Zimbabwe.

Location

Bradfield is bordered by 16th Street to the north, Bulawayo Golf Club and Lions Golf Club to the east, 23rd Avenue and Burns Drive to the south and by Angus Road to the west. Matopos Road runs from 16th Street to 23rd Avenue, in a north to south direction in the neighbourhood. Hillside Road also runs in a north to south direction through the Bradfield. The geographic coordinates of the neighbourhood are:20° 10' 40.00"S, 28° 35' 6.00"E (Latitude:-20.177778; Longitude:28.585000).

Overview
Bradfield, Zimbabwe is an upscale residential and commercial neighbourhood in Bulawayo. Commercial enterprises like banks, doctors' and dentists' offices and a shopping mall are located on Hillside Road. Upscale single-family homes occupy the  rest  of the  neighbourhood.

History
The suburb was named after Edwin Eugene Bradfield, one of the first Europeans to settle in the neighbourhood.

Population
The exact population of Bradfield, Zimbabwe is not known as of August 2011.

Points of interest
The points of interest within Bradfield or close to its borders, include the following:

 Hellenic Community Hall
 A branch of  Ecobank Zimbabwe
 Mater Dei Hospital – A private hospital, located to the immediate south of Bradfield on Burns Drive
 Bradfield Shopping Center – At the corner of Hillside Road and Burns Drive
 Bulawayo Golf Club – Located to the immediate east of Bradfield
 Bulawayo Golf Club – Located to the immediate east of Bradfield

See also

Bulawayo
Matabeleland North

References

External links
Location of Bradfield, Zimbabwe At Google Maps

Photos
Photos of Bradfield, Zimbabwe
Polling Station in Bradford, Zimbabwe

Bulawayo
Populated places in Matabeleland North Province